Airbag/How Am I Driving? is the fifth EP by the English rock band Radiohead, released in April 1998 in North America. It collects most of the B-sides from singles released from Radiohead's third album, OK Computer (1997), plus the OK Computer song "Airbag".

Contents 
Airbag/How Am I Driving? collects most of the OK Computer B-sides, omitting "Lull" (from the "Karma Police" single) and "How I Made My Millions" from the "No Surprises" single. "Meeting in the Aisle" was Radiohead's first instrumental, featuring programming by Zero 7's Henry Binns and Sam Hardaker.

Physical copies of the EP contain a questionnaire in their liner notes, along with two short stories titled "Chip Shop" and "New Job" (presumably written by Stanley Donwood, who created the artwork for OK Computer). The questionnaire is composed of seemingly random statements.

The sample that opens "A Reminder" is a recording from Prague Metro's automated announcement system: "Finish getting on and getting off; the doors are closing. The next station will be Jiřího z Poděbrad." An early version of "Palo Alto" was entitled "OK Computer".

Release and reception 

Airbag/How Am I Driving? debuted at number 56 on the Billboard 200, selling 20,000 copies in its first week. Although only 25 minutes long, the EP was nominated for a 1999 Grammy Award for Best Alternative Music Performance, up against full-length albums by other artists.

In 2009, the album was re-released by EMI on iTunes.

"Meeting in the Aisle" made its live debut in 2012 on the King of Limbs tour.

Track listing 
All songs written by Radiohead.

Personnel

Radiohead 

 Thom Yorke
 Jonny Greenwood
 Ed O'Brien
 Colin Greenwood
 Philip Selway

Production 

 Nigel Godrich

Packaging 

 Thom Yorke
 Stanley Donwood

Certifications

References 

1998 EPs
Radiohead EPs
Albums produced by Nigel Godrich
Capitol Records EPs